Matthew Saville (born 1966) is an Australian television and film director, known for Noise (2007) and A Month of Sundays (2015).

Early life and education

Saville was born around 1966, the youngest of six children, and grew up in Adelaide, South Australia. He studied at the Victorian College of the Arts.

Career
Saville began his career working as a titles designer for many Australian television series. Several of his short films, including Franz and Kafka have received awards and screened widely at film festivals. He came to wider prominence as a writer/director with his one-hour film Roy Hollsdotter Live, a bittersweet comedy about a stand-up comedian experiencing a personal breakdown. The film won awards at the Sydney Film Festival in 2003, as well as at the Australian Writers' Guild Awards.

He directed the TV comedy series Big Bite (2003–4) and We Can Be Heroes: Finding The Australian of the Year (2005), on both occasions working with Chris Lilley, as well as episodes of the drama series The Secret Life of Us (2001–2005) and the first three episodes of The Surgeon (2005).
 
In 2007 Saville's feature film debut Noise was released, for which he received an AFI nomination for Best Director. In September 2007, his opera, Crossing Live, with music by his wife Bryony Marks, was staged at the Malthouse Theatre in Melbourne. It won Victorian Green Room Awards in New Operatic Work, Best New Australian Opera Work, and was shortlisted in the 2008 Victorian Premier's Literary Awards, Prize for Best Music Script.  

In 2010 he directed Cloudstreet, a television miniseries version of Tim Winton's novel.
Saville has also worked alongside Josh Thomas, directing several episodes of Please Like Me (2013–2016), the ABC hit comedy/drama show.

His film Felony was screened in the Special Presentation section at the 2013 Toronto International Film Festival.

Saville wrote and directed the 2015 film A Month of Sundays starring Anthony LaPaglia.

Personal life
Saville is married to Bryony Marks, who is a well-known screen composer. They married in 2003 at her parents' vineyard in Gembrook, in the Dandenongs, and have two sons.

Marks has written the scores for several of Saville's films and TV series, including Noise, Felony and Please Like Me, as well as many others.

References

External links
 
 Sleepy Brain's extensive interview with Matt Saville

Australian television directors
Australian film directors
Year of birth missing (living people)

Living people
Australian screenwriters
University of Melbourne alumni